Tetracyanoquinodimethane (TCNQ) is the organic compound with the formula .  This cyanocarbon, a relative of para-quinone, is an electron acceptor that is used to prepare charge transfer salts, which are of interest in molecular electronics.

Preparation and structure
TCNQ is prepared by the condensation of 1,4-cyclohexanedione with malononitrile, followed by dehydrogenation of the resulting diene with bromine:

The molecule is planar, with D2h symmetry.

Reactions
Like tetracyanoethylene (TCNE), TCNQ is easily reduced to give a blue-coloured radical anion.  The reduction potential is about −0.3 V relative to the ferrocene/ferrocenium couple. This property is exploited in the development of charge transfer salts.  TCNQ also forms complexes with electron-rich metal complexes.

Charge transfer salts
TCNQ achieved great attention because it forms charge-transfer salts with high electrical conductivity. These discoveries were influential in the development of organic electronics.  Illustrative is the product from treatment of TCNQ with the electron donor tetrathiafulvene (TTF), TCNQ forms an ion pair, the TTF-TCNQ complex, in which TCNQ is the acceptor. This salt crystallizes in a one-dimensionally stacked polymer, consisting of segregated stacks of cations and anions of the donors and the acceptors, respectively. The complex crystal is an organic semiconductor that exhibits metallic electric conductivity.

Related compounds
Tetracyanoethylene, another cyanocarbon that functions as an electron acceptor.

References

Nitriles